Ri Richards (born November 1964) is a Welsh actress known for both English-language and Welsh-language television roles. She is best known for playing Moira Price in the award-winning comedy Satellite City and Yvonne Richards in Pobol y Cwm.  Her film appearances include a supporting role in Solomon and Gaenor (1999).

Richards was married to Peter Alner, a taxi driver, until his death in November 2016. After he died of cancer, she helped launch a campaign to raise funds for charities that care for the terminally ill.

Films
Solomon and Gaenor (1999)
Patagonia (2010)
Dante's Daemon (2013)

Television

English language 
A Mind to Kill (1994; also filmed in Welsh)
Satellite City (1996-99)
Mine All Mine (2004)
High Hopes (2005)
Casualty (2005)
Belonging (2006)
TARDISODE #8 (2006)
We Hunt Together (2022)

Welsh language 
Pobol y Cwm (2002)
Alys (2011-12)
Gwaith/Cartref (2011)
Parch (2016)

References

External links

1964 births
Living people